The 1915 season of Úrvalsdeild was the fourth season of league football in Iceland and the first for three years. Fram won the championship for a third time in a row.

League standings

Results

References

Úrvalsdeild karla (football) seasons
Iceland
Iceland
Urvalsdeild